Cedar Hill High School (CHHS) is a comprehensive public high school located in the city of Cedar Hill, Texas (USA) in Dallas County and is classified as a 6A school by the UIL. It is a part of the Cedar Hill Independent School District located in southwest Dallas County. In 2018-19, the school received a "C" rating by the Texas Education Agency

The district, and therefore the school, serves most of the city of Cedar Hill and portions of Grand Prairie, Ovilla, Duncanville and Dallas.

Academics
Cedar Hill has several Advanced Placement courses which allow ambitious students an opportunity to take college-level courses on campus.  And recently, Cedar Hill established a S.T.E.A.M. program which is designed to groom and engage students seriously interested in pursuing a career in science, technology, engineering, arts, or mathematics.

Demographics
In 2018-19, 73.3 percent of the students were African-American, 19.9% Hispanic, 3% Two or More Races, and 1% Other.

Athletics
The Cedar Hill Longhorns compete in the following sports:

Baseball
Basketball
Cross Country
Football
Golf
Powerlifting
Soccer
Softball
Swimming and Diving
Tennis
Track and Field
Volleyball

Marching Band and CHHS Cheer
The Cedar Hill Longhorn Red Army Marching Band and Cheerleaders are the two largest student organizations dedicated to supporting CHHS athletics.

State titles
Football.  
2006 5A Division II (defeated Houston Cypress Falls) 
2013 5A Division II (defeated Katy) 
2014 6A Division II (defeated Katy)

On December 23, 2006, the 16-0 Cedar Hill High School Longhorn football team won its first state championship, defeating Cypress Falls 51-17 at the Alamodome in San Antonio.

On December 21, 2013, the football team won its second state title, defeating Katy High School 34-24 at AT&T Stadium in Arlington, Texas.

In 2014, Cedar Hill football program was ranked as one of the nation's Top 10.

Rivalry
Cedar Hill maintains a popular and well-noted rivalry with the nearby Desoto High School Eagles. The rivalry is known as the "Battle of the Belt Line".

Notable alumni
Quincy Adeboyejo, professional football player 
Josh Allen, professional football player
Dezmon Briscoe, former professional football player
Trevis Gipson, football player
Thomas Gipson, professional basketball player and brother of Trevis.
Joyner Holmes, American professional basketball player
Daniel Horton, former professional basketball player 
Ugo Ihemelu, professional soccer player
T-Dre Player, professional football player
Jason Richardson, silver medalist in the 110m hurdles at the 2012 Summer Olympics in London.
Josh Thomas, professional football player
Derrius Thompson, former professional football player and current Cedar Hill Teacher/Coach

References

External links

 

Educational institutions in the United States with year of establishment missing
Public high schools in Dallas County, Texas